Stony Brook University CDP is a census-designated place (CDP) covering the Stony Brook University campus in Suffolk County, on Long Island, in New York, United States. It covers the permanent resident population of the campus and is not reflective of either the student body or include students who list their permanent residency elsewhere.

The population was 10,409 at the 2020 census.

Demographics

2020 census

Note: the US Census treats Hispanic/Latino as an ethnic category. This table excludes Latinos from the racial categories and assigns them to a separate category. Hispanics/Latinos can be of any race.

References

Census-designated places in Suffolk County, New York
Census-designated places in New York (state)